The Caspar CLE 11 was a cantilever-parasol monoplane cabin airliner built and flown in Germany in 1923.

Development
One CLE 11 was built (registration D-294), and it took part in the International Air Exhibition in Gothenburg (Sweden) in July 1923.

Specifications

References

Citations

Bibliography

1920s German airliners